Amasia is a possible future supercontinent which could be formed by the merger of Asia and  the Americas. The prediction relies mostly on the fact that the Pacific Plate is already subducting under Eurasia and the Americas, a process which if continued will eventually cause the Pacific to close. Meanwhile, because of the Atlantic mid-ocean ridge, North America would be pushed westward. Thus, the Atlantic at some point in the future would be larger than the Pacific. In Siberia, the boundary between the Eurasian and North /South American Plates has been stationary for millions of years. The combination of these factors would cause the Americas to be combined with Asia, thus forming a supercontinent. A February 2012 study predicts Amasia will form over the North Pole, in about 50 to 200 million years.

Alternative scenarios
Paleogeologist Ronald Blakey has described the next 15 to 100 million years of tectonic development as fairly settled and predictable but no supercontinent will form in that time frame. Beyond that, he cautions that the geologic record is full of unexpected shifts in tectonic activity that make further projections "very, very speculative". In addition to Amasia, two other hypothetical supercontinents—Christopher Scotese's "Pangaea Proxima" and Roy Livermore's "Novopangaea"—were illustrated in an October 2007 New Scientist article. Another supercontinent, Aurica, has been proposed in more recent times.

References

Further reading
 Nield, Ted, Supercontinent: Ten Billion Years in the Life of Our Planet, Harvard University Press, 2009, 

Future supercontinents